The welterweight division in mixed martial arts contains different weight classes:

The UFC's welterweight division, which groups competitors within 156 to 170 lb (71 to 77 kg)
The ONE Championship's welterweight division, with upper limit at

Ambiguity and clarification
Many other sports that use the welterweight class, such as boxing, kickboxing, and Muay Thai, define it as below about 147 lb (67 kg). The MMA welterweight class is therefore significantly heavier than the welterweight class of these other sports.
For the sake of uniformity, many American mixed martial arts websites refer to competitors between 156 and 170 lb (71 and 77 kg) as welterweights. This encompasses the Shooto middleweight division (167 lb / 76 kg).

The welterweight limit, as defined by the Nevada State Athletic Commission and the Association of Boxing Commissions is 170 lb (77kg).

Professional Champions

Current champions
This table is not always up to date. Last updated March 19, 2023.

Most wins in Welterweight title bouts 

Note: the list includes wins in bouts for welterweight titles of major promotions (UFC, Strikeforce, WEC, Bellator)
Note: the list includes both undisputed and interim champions
 Active title reign

See also
List of current MMA Welterweight champions
List of UFC Welterweight Champions
List of Strikeforce Welterweight Champions
List of Pancrase Welterweight Champions

Notes
a.Fight was recorded as a "Majority Decision Draw". Woodley retained his title.

References

Mixed martial arts weight classes